Over Barrier (Belarusian: Над Бар'ерам) is a Belarusian committee on protection of prisoners' rights. It was created on May 22, 2007.

History
On May 22, 2007, in Vilnius, Lithuania it was announced about creation of the Belarusian Committee on the protection of prisoners’ rights «OVER BARRIER» (BCPPR «OVER BARRIER») The decision to organize the constituent assembly on the territory of Lithuania was made due impossibility of organization registration in Belarus.

20 citizens of Belarus, who in different situations, faced "problems and imperfection of penitentiary systems" of Belarus - had taken part in the constituent assembly.

The organizing committee on creation of the BCPPR «OVER BARRIER» included former political prisoners Cimafiej Drančuk and Źmicier Kaśpiarovič, public activists Vieranika Vyhoŭskaja and Kryścina Šacikava, and other participants of the constituent assembly.

The constituent assembly has charged Cimafiej Drančuk and Vieranika Vyhoŭskaja to prepare necessary documents for registration of the BCPPR «OVER BARRIER» in the Republic of Lithuania.

Leaders of BCPPR "Over Barrier"
Cimafiej Drančuk
Źmicier Kaśpiarovič
Vieranika Vyhoŭskaja

The aims of creation
Creation of the BCPPR «OVER BARRIER» is caused by absence of working in Belarus human rights organizations that deal with a problem of Belarusian prisoners on a large scale, and concentrates exclusively on protection of the rights of political prisoners, which is minimal in comparison with total arrested. Thus practice shows that the scale of violation of the rights of ordinary prisoners is bigger, but none of them has opportunity to receive a high-grade legal support, to draw attention of the public to the problem and to achieve justice.

The priority purpose of the Committee is attraction of public attention to the problems of prisoners in Belarus, whose rights are violated, with no discrimination, whether in what of places of correction or restriction of freedom they are, are they a victim of a miscarriage of justice or punished according to the law.

It’s clear, how difficult is for our society to understand motives and acts of people, which have ended up in jails. Many prisoners are not classical victims with the pure past and clear future. They have violated the law, but for it have already had severe punishment, having lost freedom, appearing isolated from a society, relatives and friends, having lost many rights. But they also as other citizens of our country have rights guaranteed by the UN Declaration of human rights and the Constitution of Belarus. 
Nobody has rights to torture, to beat, to kill, to humiliate human advantage, to violate none. More over lawful representatives of the society on behalf of law enforcement bodies should not turn punishment into crime.

Also, the purposes of the Committee is distribution of the information on facts of violation of the rights of prisoners irrespective of, whether they are suspected, accused or convicted; creation of monitoring of violation of the rights of prisoners in Belarus; contribution to restoration of justice in the attitude to illegally convicted or those whose rights were broken.

On the most provoking violations BCPPR organizes distribution of press releases and achieves reaction of representatives responsible for observance of legality.

References

Publications about creation of the BCPPR «Over Barrier»
http://www.svaboda.org/content/Article/758330.html
http://www.svaboda.org/content/Article/759198.html
http://www.nv-online.info/index.php?c=nw&i=4127
http://www.nv-online.info/index.php?c=ar&i=4239
http://www.nv-online.info/index.php?c=ar&i=4374
http://www.belgazeta.by/20070604.22/480264471
http://www.camarade.biz/page/1/bo/2020/article.html
http://www.euramost.org/?artc=12202
http://www.maidan.org.ua/static/news/2007/1180381826.html
http://www.prison.org/smi/05062007.shtml
http://spletni.ru/view_news.php?id=366065
http://21.by/news/read1.php?id=158571
http://telegraf.by/belarus/2007/05/29/barier/
http://za.nashih.info/node/560

Publications under the first information on violations of rights
http://www.charter97.org/bel/news/2007/06/05/grubo
http://www.ucpb.org/?lang=rus&open=14578
http://www.belaruspartisan.org/bp-forte/?page=100&backPage=13&news=13384&newsPage=0
http://www.nv-online.info/index.php?c=ar&i=7146
http://www.camarade.biz/page/1/bo/1858/article.html
http://www.kozylin.com/node/6397
http://www.svaboda.org/content/Article/822772.html
http://spring96.org/ru/news/19478/
http://www.ucpb.org/?lang=rus&open=16441
http://www.ucpb.org/?lang=rus&open=16461
http://www.ucpb.org/?lang=rus&open=16466
http://naviny.by/rubrics/society/2007/12/13/ic_articles_116_154454/
http://news.open.by/333/2007-12-13/43561/
http://www.charter97.org/be/news/2007/12/14/2404/
http://www.qwas.ru/belarus/ucpb/id_85772/
http://www.belaruspartisan.org/bp-forte/?page=100&backPage=21&news=20248&newsPage=0
http://nrs.ru/articles/22019.html
http://www.newsdate.by/society_32155.html
http://www.ucpb.org/?lang=rus&open=16484
http://spring96.org/files/book/conditions_of_detention_2008_en.pdf

Human rights organizations based in Belarus